Wladimir Rodrigues dos Santos (born 29 August 1954, in São Paulo) was a former football (soccer) player in the left back role.

As a player, Wladimir had a long and distinguished career, best remembered for his time at Corinthians, becoming one of the most highly regarded defenders this team has ever produced.

He won four São Paulo State Championships (in 1977, 1979, 1982 and 1983) and is the most capped player in Corinthians history with 803 matches played.

In 1998 Federação Paulista de Futebol named him in the Paulista League all-time best XI, alongside players like Rivelino, Ademir da Guia, Pelé, Djalma Santos and others.

He was also named, by Placar Magazine, as the best left back in Corinthians history.

Career
 Corinthians: 1972–1985
 Santo André: 1986
 Corinthians: 1987
 Ponte Preta: 1988
 Santos: 1989
 Cruzeiro: 1990
 Central Brasileira de Cotia: 1991
 São Caetano

References

External links

1954 births
Living people
Brazilian footballers
Brazil international footballers
1983 Copa América players
Esporte Clube Santo André players
Sport Club Corinthians Paulista players
Associação Desportiva São Caetano players
Cruzeiro Esporte Clube players
Santos FC players
Associação Atlética Ponte Preta players
Association football defenders
Footballers from São Paulo